Showa Maru No. 8 (Japanese: 第八昭和丸) was an auxiliary minesweeper of the Imperial Japanese Navy during World War II.

History
Showa Maru No. 8 was laid down on 1 April 1936 at the shipyard of K.K. Osaka Tekkosho Honsha Kojo at the behest of shipping company, Nippon Suisan K.K. She was launched on 24 July 1936 and completed 31 August 1936. On 12 September 1941, she was requisitioned by the Imperial Japanese Navy and converted to an auxiliary minesweeper under Reserve Lieutenant Kawai Iitsuka (河合彌). Kawai served until 23 August 1943 when he was replaced by Reserve Lieutenant Kusegawa Shinji (久瀬川晋二). Her fate is uncertain.

References

1936 ships
Ships built in Japan
World War II minesweepers of Japan
Mine warfare vessels of the Imperial Japanese Navy
Auxiliary ships of the Imperial Japanese Navy